Rwanda competed at the 2016 Summer Olympics in Rio de Janeiro, Brazil, from 5 to 21 August 2016. This was the nation's ninth consecutive appearance at the Summer Olympics.

The Rwandan National Olympic and Sports Committee selected a team of seven athletes, four men and three women, to compete only in athletics, road cycling, mountain biking, and swimming at the Olympics, matching the nation's roster size with London 2012. The Rwandan delegation featured two returning Olympians from the previous Games, including marathon runner Claudette Mukasakindi, and road cyclist Adrien Niyonshuti, who reprised his role of carrying the nation's flag for the second time in the opening ceremony.

Athletics (track and field)
 
Rwandan athletes have so far achieved qualifying standards in the following athletics events (up to a maximum of 3 athletes in each event):

Track & road events

Cycling

Road
Rwanda has qualified one rider in the men's Olympic road race by virtue of his top 10 individual ranking in the 2015 UCI Africa Tour.

Mountain biking
Rwanda has qualified one mountain biker for the men's Olympic cross-country race, by virtue of a top two national finish, not yet qualified, at the 2015 African Championships.

Swimming

Rwanda has received a Universality invitation from FINA to send two swimmers (one male and one female) to the Olympics.

References

External links 
 

Nations at the 2016 Summer Olympics
2016
Olympics